5A Fortress in Brooklyn: Race, Real Estate, and the Making of Hasidic Williamsburg is a nonfiction book by Jewish studies professor Nathaniel Deutsch and historian Michael Casper, published by Yale University Press in May, 2021. It has been favorably reviewed in NYBooks, The Jewish News of Northern California, and The Jewish Journal of Greater Los Angeles.

Contents 
The 391-page book minutiously chronicles the history of the Yiddish speaking  community of Williamsburg (Brooklyn, NY): its stringent inception in the post World War II years by a wave of Hasidic Jew immigration originated from Eastern European shtetls, its contentious relations with neighboring African American and Puerto Rican communities, and its partly reluctant but progressive gentrification by the forces of commerce and urban development. The narrative covers historic, racial, sociological, political, urbanistic, and emotional aspects.

Critique 
Critics from various sources encounter the book "persuasive" (Samuel Stein, Jewish Currents, 2021). "fascinating" (Zalman Newfield, New Books Network),  or "delightful, compelling, interesting" (Bennet Baumer, The Indypendent). Ben Rothke (The Times of Israel) praised its  "spellbinding narrative", while Gabe S. Tennen (Gothan Center) referred to the book as "detailed, crisply written, a caveat to nearly fifty years of scholarship".

Awards 
The book won the 71st National Jew­ish Book Awards in Amer­i­can Jew­ish Stud­ies (2022) given by the Jewish Book Council, in recognition to the "impres­sive train­ing, sen­si­tiv­i­ty and scholarly style"  distinguishing the authors.

References 

2021 non-fiction books
English non-fiction books
English-language books
Books about New York City
Books about Jews and Judaism
Books about urbanism
History books about the United States
Yale University Press books
Historical novelists by nationality